Louis-Constant Fleming (born 1 December 1946) is a member of the Senate of France, representing the island of Saint-Martin. He was born on the Dutch side of the island, Sint Maarten, where he attended primary school. He later left the island and went on to Canada. He has a degree in politics from a French university. He is a well known political figure in the French Caribbean, where he has held many positions. He is currently a member of the Union for a Popular Movement, and is the senator of Saint Martin. The only hospital in Saint Martin was named after him.

References
Page on the Senate website

1946 births
Living people
French Senators of the Fifth Republic
Presidents of the Territorial Council of Saint Martin
Members of the Territorial Council of Saint Martin
Union for a Popular Movement politicians
Gaullism, a way forward for France
Senators of Saint Martin